Salvatore Giannone (born 24 July 1936) is a retired Italian sprinter. Running the 4×100 m relay he won a gold medal at the 1959 Summer Universiade and finished in fourth place at the 1960 Olympics.

See also
 Italy national relay team

References

External links
 

1936 births
Living people
Italian male sprinters
Olympic athletes of Italy
Athletes (track and field) at the 1960 Summer Olympics
Universiade medalists in athletics (track and field)
Universiade gold medalists for Italy
Medalists at the 1959 Summer Universiade